Wienhausen is a municipality in the district of Celle, in Lower Saxony, Germany.  It is known for Wienhausen Abbey, referenced in the municipal coat of arms.

References

Celle (district)